Mountain Fork, also known as the Mountain Fork of the Little River, is a  tributary of the Little River in western Arkansas and southeastern Oklahoma in the United States.  Via the Little and Red rivers, it is part of the watershed of the Mississippi River.

Course

The Mountain Fork rises in the Ouachita Mountains in Le Flore County, Oklahoma, and then flows southeastwardly into Polk County, Arkansas, then southwestwardly into McCurtain County, Oklahoma, where it turns southward for the remainder of its course.

In its upper course, the river flows through a portion of the Ouachita National Forest.  In McCurtain County, the river is dammed to form Broken Bow Lake. Nancy Branch is a tributary of the river.

Discharge

Recreation and conservation

The Upper Mountain Fork River offers  of canoeing or kayaking from near Hatfield, Arkansas to Broken Bow Lake. This part of the river has class I and II rapids. clear water, fishing for smallmouth bass and other species, and excellent scenery with pine forests covering the hills and bluffs along the river's course. Water levels in the river are generally adequate for boating year-round.  On the upper portion of Broken Bow Lake is the McCurtain County Wilderness Area, an Oklahoma State-owned  tract which contains the largest remaining virgin shortleaf pine/hardwood forest in the nation.  Hunting is permitted in the wilderness area.

Class I and II rapids are found in the upper part of this section and paddlers must navigate waterfalls with a four foot (1.2 meter) drop. Bald cypress trees line and, in some places, grow in the river. The cool waters issuing below Broken Bow dam provide year round habitat and fishing for rainbow and brown trout which are stocked regularly throughout the year. In 2008, a 17 pound 4 ounce (7.8 kilogram) brown trout was caught by an angler in the Mountain Fork.

See also
List of Arkansas rivers
List of Oklahoma rivers

References

Columbia Gazetteer of North America
DeLorme (2004).  Arkansas Atlas & Gazetteer.  Yarmouth, Maine: DeLorme.  .
DeLorme (2003).  Oklahoma Atlas & Gazetteer.  Yarmouth, Maine: DeLorme.  .

External links
Mountain Fork River - Video footage of the area and a list of local activities and resources.
Oklahoma Digital Maps: Digital Collections of Oklahoma and Indian Territory

Rivers of Arkansas
Rivers of Oklahoma
Bodies of water of Le Flore County, Oklahoma
Bodies of water of McCurtain County, Oklahoma
Rivers of Polk County, Arkansas
Tributaries of the Red River of the South